Stamatios Nikolopoulos was a Greek racing cyclist.  He competed at the 1896 Summer Olympics in Athens winning two silver medals.

Nikolopoulos competed in the 333 metres and the 2 kilometres races, placing second in each to Frenchman Paul Masson.  Nikolopoulos's time in the 2 kilometres was 5:00.2.  He tied with Adolf Schmal for second at 26.0 seconds in the initial race of the 333 metres, and defeated Schmal in a race-off to take second place to himself.  His time in the race-off was 25.4 seconds.

References

External links

Year of birth missing
Year of death missing
Greek male cyclists
Greek track cyclists
Cyclists at the 1896 Summer Olympics
19th-century sportsmen
Olympic silver medalists for Greece
Olympic cyclists of Greece
Place of birth missing
Olympic medalists in cycling
Medalists at the 1896 Summer Olympics
Place of death missing
19th-century Greek people